Guillermo Fesser Pérez de Petinto (Madrid; 1960) is a Spanish journalist known for utilizing humor while reporting news on Spanish radio throughout his innovative program called Gomaespuma. It was perceived as a breath of fresh air among the serious media of the time and it was an instant hit. Fesser studied Journalism at the Universidad Complutense de Madrid. He received a Fulbright Scholarship to study film at the University of Southern California, Los Angeles.

With his partner Juan Luis Cano, Fesser created in 1984 Gomaespuma, a company that has produced shows and commercials for radio and television as well as books, music albums and cultural events. Both Fesser and Cano, lead since 2000 the Gomaespuma Foundation. This non profitable organization is mostly dedicated to facilitate an access to education to hundreds of children in Nicaragua and Sri Lanka. But Gomaespuma Foundation has supported another kind of programs like the drilling of water wells in Southern Senegal. To raise funds, Gomaespuma organizes cultural events as the Flamenco Festival Flamenco Pá Tós that promotes flamenco dance and music locally in Madrid (Spain), and internationally in cities like Beijing (China), Argel (Argelia) and Managua (Nicaragua). Profits from the festival help finance the educational projects.

He was the director, executive producer and one of the screenwriters of the film Cándida (2006). He is also brother of a film director Javier Fesser and the cultural promoter Alberto Fesser.

Radio 
Guillermo Fesser is mostly known as a radio personality. For 25 years (1982–2007) he was hosting with his partner Juan Luis Cano one of the most popular radio shows in Spain: Gomaespuma. The show started as a weekly late night program in Antena 3 Radio in May 1982, and it got to its peak as a daily morning show on M-80 Radio, with over 1 Million listeners throughout the country. During the Gomaespuma years, Cano and Fesser traveled around the world to cover the news, interviewing key people like the King of Jordan and Vice President Al Gore just to name a few. Both, Fesser and Cano became personally involved in attempting to fight against poverty and injustice.  This was what led them into creating the foundation that bears the name of their radio program Gomaespuma.
Before, Fesser was the anchor with Juan Luis Cano, Santiago Alcanda and Jaime Barella of one of the first FM late night radio talk shows in Spain (in Francoist Spain the FM radio was not allowed to broadcast after midnight. In 1981, the law was changed). This radio show,  El Flexo (the desk light), was perceived as a breath of fresh air among the up tied and serious media of the time and it was an instant hit for Radio Madrid. El Flexo is considered the ancestor of Gomaespuma. 
Fesser met his partner Juan Luis Cano in 1977 at Universidad Complutense de Madrid.

Movie 

Guillermo Fesser directed in 2005 the feature film Cándida, a story based on his bestselling biography of a cleaning lady Cuando Dios Aprieta Ahoga Pero Bien (Memorias de Una Asistenta) (When God chokes, he chokes to death).

Previously he co-wrote with his brother Javier the screenplay of two big box office movies: El Milagro de P. Tinto (1999)
and La Gran Aventura de Mortadelo y Filemón (2003), both directed by his brother.

In 1994 Fesser produced, with the advice of Kermit Love, the puppeteer that created Big Bird for Sesame Street, a puppet show for Telecinco: Gomaespuma. Due to that experience, later he manipulated and gave his voice to the funny puppet that appeared in his brother first short film Aquel ritmillo. He also worked as a script supervisor on El Secdleto de la Tlompeta, the multi-awarded second short film directed by Javier..

Fesser has translated and adapted several English and American films to his native language to be dubbed into Spanish. As Gomaespuma, with Cano, he has given his voice to many cartoon characters in children features as Chicken Run, Quest For Camelot, Cats & Dogs,  and Chicken Run 2, and he has adapted and dubbed into Spanish some other films as the one from Sacha Baron Cohen Ali G Indahouse .

Television 
In the mid-1980s Guillermo Fesser presented the TV program La Tarde de Verano, with Pastora Vega and Toni Cantó, and for some months in 1992, the contest VIP Noche at Telecinco.
In 1994, in collaboration with Kermit Love, creator of the puppets of Jim Henson's factory designed a puppet show for Telecinco. Accomplished by Javier Fesser and with scripts of Juan Luis Cano and himself, the program was released in 1994 named Gomaespuma. Both Fesser and Cano worked on it as puppeteers manipulating his foam rubber characters.
As Gomaespuma and himself he has appeared in numerous television interviews. Gomaespuma has produced special news shows for Televisión Española (TVE). Pasando Olimpicamente, a daily night show broadcast live from Beijing during the 2008 Games. Pasandolo de Cine, a daily show from San Sebastian during the International Film Festival. GomaespumEnglish, an ESL program for pre-school children to learn the basics of the English language.

Currently he produces and presents from New York A Cien Millas de Manhattan (A Hundred Miles from Manhattan), a series of skits, mini-documentaries on American daily life for the Spanish TVE political program 59 segundos (59 seconds).

Literature 
As a writer, Fesser has published several books and has written three fictional movie scripts. His first non fictional book was Cuando Dios Aprieta Ahoga Pero Bien (Memorias de Una Asistenta): When God chokes, chokes to death (housemaid's memories), published in 1998, which was made into a movie directed by himself. It was released in 2006. 
This book tells the story of Cándida Villar, the Fesser family housekeeper, a woman from Martos (Jaén). It is the story of its beginnings as a housemaid, the mistreatment of her husband and her current life, working as film critic for Gomaespuma. It is a real biography. Guillermo knows Cándida from his youth.
In addition, he has collaborated with Juan Luis Cano in writing three comic books with drawings of Vicente Luis Conejos: "Marchando una de mili", "Navidad con orejas" and "Pasando Olímpicamente". Three books for the publishing house "Temas de Hoy": "Familia no hay más que una", "Grandes disgustos de la historia de España" and "¿Quién me mandaría meterme en obras?". A book of interviews "El Papa dijo no". A comic with art by Jose Luis Agreda "A la fuerza ahorcan"
Two memory books of Gomaespuma have been already published: "20 años de Gomaespuma" (20 years of Gomaespuma), written by two journalist, Curra Fernández and Nuria Serena. And "Memorias de Gomaespuma" (Gomaespuma memories), by the journalist Mario Jimenez. They have also written the texts for the photo book ¡Vivan los novios! (Up with weddings!) with kitsch wedding photographs by Juan Cruz Megías and published by "La Fábrica".

Others 
Guillermo Fesser has been lately involved with projects that support the ideas behind the Buy Local and Slow Food movements. He is one of the promoters that have saved from demolition and renovated the old building and traditional market Mercado de San Miguel, a glass and iron building located downtown Madrid. He has published many articles in major newspapers like El País and El Mundo, and has taught script writing at the Universidad de Alcalá de Henares and Vassar College, Poughkeepsie.
Fesser currently lives in Rhinebeck, New York. He is working with writer Mark Burns on a film about sustainable farming and the dangers of natural gas hydraulic fracturing.
His first script for the theater, Ay Dios Mio! (Oh My God!), written with Cuban-Spanish author Eduardo Consuegra, is currently under production in Madrid.

Bibliography
¿Quien Me Mandaría Meterme En Obras?
Cuando Dios Aprieta, Ahoga pero Bien: Cándida, Memorias de una Sirvienta (1999)
A Cien Millas de Manhattan (2008)
El Misterioso Caso de los Fantasmas Solitarios (2011)
Ruedas y el Secreto del GPS (2012)
Ruedas y el Enigma del Campamento Moco Tendido (2013)
Conoce a Bernardo de Gálvez (2017)
Mi Amigo Invisible (2018)

Filmography

References

External links

 Juan Luis Cano
 Flamenco Pá Tós
 Cándida
 Cuando Dios Aprieta Ahora Pero Bien (Memorias de Una Asistenta)
 El Milagro de P. Tinto
 Aquel ritmillo
 El Secdleto de la Tlompeta
 Pastora Vega
 Toni Cantó
 A Cien Millas de Manhattan (TV)
 59 segundos
 Cándida Villar
 A Cien Millas de Manhattan (Book)
 Aguilar
 Mercado de San Miguel
 Mark Burns

Spanish journalists
Spanish radio personalities
Spanish male screenwriters
Spanish film directors
Living people
1960 births